Gibney Beach, also called Oppenheimer Beach, is a stretch of white sandy beach located on Hawksnest Bay on St John Island in the United States Virgin Islands.  There is vibrant wildlife both on the beach and in the bay.  The colonial history, the natives, the beatnik and hippie movements, and the locals of the island come together to form the original, bohemian character of the beach.

History

Land area and owners
In 1950, the property was purchased by former New York City residents Robert Gibney and his wife, Nancy Flagg Gibney. Robert was a writer-artist and friend of Thomas Merton; Nancy was a magazine editor. Before the purchase, Gibney Beach had only been known as  Hawksnest Beach. The original  parcel of land purchased by the Gibneys has been divided and sold in a number of ways through the years.Some of the beach area is now part of the Virgin Islands National Park.  A small piece of land, on the far northeastern section of the beach, was sold in 1957 to J. Robert Oppenheimer, an atomic scientist and member of the Manhattan Project. This land was eventually donated to “the people of Saint John” by his daughter after her death. The house was later refurbished by the government and opened as a community center.

The remaining Gibney property is private and contains the original Gibney home, a house built for the late John Gibney, which is now occupied by his widow and son, two guest houses that are used as rental property for vacationers, many fruit trees, unique island foliage and gardens.  The Gibney Beach Cottage is one of the few rentals directly on the beach in St. John and the other guest cottage is located in the garden area among the vast fruit trees. The beach area in front of the vegetation line is open to the public.
	
Trees along the beach provide shade. Visitors bring their dogs and horses to the beach. During high tide, in some places, there is not much beach space.

Colonial history
The Taino Indians inhabited St. John's North shore in the period around AD 1100. They established one of several  villages on what is now known as Hawksnest Point located between Hawksnest and Caneel Bay. Early European settlers named this part of Hawksnest Bay "Fortuna Bay", a name that appears on the manuscript map of Peter Lotharios Oxholm drawn in 1780. This eastern shore of the Bay was part of the large Susanaberg sugar plantation at the top of the watershed. A small bay rum oil still was operational on the property in the late 19th century, and  a tiny factory distilled rum  from sugarcane for manufacture of the bay rum cologne. John Lindquist, owner of much of St. John's North Shore in the early 20th century, planted coconuts, bananas, and other fruit trees on this property and neighboring Denis Bay, as well as at his home at Cinnamon Bay.

The Gibneys
Robert and Nancy Gibney came to St. John on their honeymoon in 1946.  Robert was 31 at the time and Nancy was 25. They planned to spend a few months in the islands. In order to stay this extended time, Nancy had to quit her job as a feature editor at Vogue magazine.  Robert planned to write a novel while in the islands.  The Gibneys rented a small cottage on Cruz Bay Beach. Later when friends Julius and Cleome Wadsworth, who lived on Denis Bay, moved back to the states for the summer, the Gibneys stayed in their home rent free. When the Wadsworths returned the following winter, the Gibneys were not yet ready to leave their beloved island so they moved into a shed on Henley Cay, an  island on Caneel Bay.  At the time this was the only available housing to be found, and the Gibneys ended up living there for the next three years. In 1950 Robert's father died and left Robert and Nancy enough money to look into buying land on St. John.  They purchased  of land on Hawksnest Bay and made it their own. Their house was built in the center of the beach from rocks found onsite. Gibney beach became home to Robert, Nancy, and their three children, Ed, Eleanor and John. Robert home schooled all three children.  He worked for Caneel Bay during the expansion of the resort in the 1950s. In the 1960s he became a librarian in Cruz Bay. Nancy wrote short stories.  Women's magazines such as McCall's and Redbook normally published her works.

Robert died in 1973 and Nancy in 1980 and are interred in a Cruz Bay cemetery.  The couple left the beach property to their children in their will; the land was divided among them.  Ed Gibney, their first-born child, is a lifelong resident of Saint John and works as a surveyor. Eleanor is on the board of the St. John Historical Society. She too is a lifelong resident on St. John, having grown up on her family's beachfront property. For fifteen years she worked for the Caneel Bay Resort becoming the chief horticulturalist. She is the author of A Field Guide to Native Trees and Plants of East End, St. John U.S. Virgin Islands. She married Gary Ray and they have two children. The Gibney's second son, John, died in 2003. He lived on Gibney Beach, planting and tending to a garden of tropical trees. John Gibney's remains are interred on the property within his garden.

The Oppenheimers
After living on the beach for seven years, the Gibneys were forced to sell part of their land to J. Robert Oppenheimer in 1957 due to financial problems. J. Robert Oppenheimer is known as “the father of the atomic bomb.” The Gibneys sold their most northeastern part of the land to Robert Oppenheimer and his wife, Kitty, who built a vacation home. After their death, The Oppenheimers left the land to their daughter, Toni. Toni died in 1976 and left the property to “the people of St. John”. The land is now a public park.	
The “people of St. John” did not attend to the responsibilities left by this gift, and the house was vandalized and covered with graffiti. It soon fell into disrepair. Finally, the United States Virgin Island government took over the property, and created a Community Center on the property. Now, the center can be rented out by paying a small fee for such events as senior citizen outings, Boy Scouts meetings, local reggae and calypso bands, picnics, weddings, and birthday parties.

The property sale by the Gibneys to the Oppenheimers proved to be a problem among the families and brought with it much controversy and heartache.

The case
To avoid over development the Gibneys had a series of deed restrictions placed on the selling of their land. The deed restricted the property to a one family dwelling. In order to preserve the natural environment, the placement of any structure had to be pre-approved by the Gibneys. The Gibneys also placed deed restrictions that prohibited the rental of the property.  Also, in their deed, they had the right to repurchase the property if and when the Oppenheimers wanted to sell the land. This first right of refusal was the most important part of the deed to the Gibneys. At first, the Gibney's deed did not seem to restrict the Oppenheimers, but they began renting their vacation cottage, soon after it was built, through the local real estate agency. The Gibneys disapproved, and the Oppenheimers argued against the Gibneys and said that the tenants they were renting to were “just friends of theirs”. When Robert Oppenheimer died, Kitty began construction on a second building. Once again, the Gibneys protested and Kitty pleaded that this building was, “just a tool shed”.  The so-called “tool shed” was built on the property line between the Gibneys and the Oppenheimers, and was too close to the beach according to the Gibneys. That Christmas, both of the buildings built by the Oppenheimers were rented out to, “just friends”. The friendly relationship between the Gibneys and the Oppenheimers ended. A number of lawsuits followed,  and the police were called to intervene on several occasions.
	
After Kitty died, the Oppenheimers' land was left to their daughter Toni. Toni committed suicide and left the land to “the people of St. John for a public park and recreation”. The Gibneys rejected the idea of a public park and expressed to Robert Meyner, Toni's executor to estate, their Right of First Refusal. In Meyner's responses he declared that their Right of First Refusal only applied to a sale, not a donation. The Gibneys fought back warning Meyner they would engage in a new deed saying only a one family residence could be built. Meyner responded that there would be no need for future buildings. 
	
Even with the deterioration of the building and property following Toni's death, the Gibneys did not give up on their fight. They wanted to regain control of the property, but faced numerous delays. When Robert Gibney died in 1973, Nancy kept fighting. Nancy passed in 1980 without resolving the conflict.  The National Park Beach took over the property at Hawksnest Beach and a parking lot, changing area, pit toilets, barbecue grills, tables, benches, and sheltered pavilions were added to the property. The beach's visiting population grew.  The land became known as Hawksnest Beach and the smaller section Gibney Beach.  The Government of the Virgin Islands took ownership of the Oppenheimer land. They renovated the old house and made improvements to the land; it is now used as a Community Center. A large iron gate was placed at the entrance to the Gibney's property on the North Shore Road to prevent cars from entering. Ironically, the gate was plainly inscribed “Oppenheimer Beach”.Two driveways serve as the entrances to the Gibney's private property.

National Park Service buys Gibney
A great amount of Gibney Beach today is under the stewardship of the United States Virgin Islands National Park.  Thus, the property belongs to the United States citizens and their guests. The  of the waterfront land were the first major acquisition made by the Virgin Islands National Park since January 4, 1979, when they acquired the Annaberg estate. On August 15, 1997, Robert and Nancy Gibney's children; Ed, Eleanor and John decided to option their portion of the beachfront property to The Trust of Public Land, an organization working in partnership with The Friends of the Virgin Islands National Park. Friends is a non-profit organization dedicated to the protection and preservation of the natural and cultural resources of the Virgin Islands’ National Parks. As the official private sector partner to the Park, Friends is a membership organization that raises funds from individuals, corporations, and foundations to supplement the Park's budget.	
At the time, the remaining  of the Gibney's land was valued at over 3.5 million dollars. The Gibneys were not concerned about the money; they agreed to sell the land to the Trust for less than the market price.  It became clear that without creative compromise, there would not be adequate resources to compensate Ed and Eleanor. Consequently, Ed agreed to re-subdivide his property to include all of his beachfront, but somewhat less than his total acreage. Eleanor agreed to retain a right to remain on her property for a term of 30 years in exchange for the reduced price.

Wildlife 
On St. John there are 140 species of birds, 302 species of fish, 7 species of amphibians, 22 species of mammals and 740 species of plants inhabiting the island.  In addition there are about 50 coral species, many gorgonians, and sponges.  The only mammal native to Saint John is the bat; however, many non-native animals have been introduced to the island over the years, such as dogs, cats, donkeys, sheep, deer and pigs. Many of these animals and topography elements can be found on Gibney beach, whether in the ocean or on the shore or off into the jungle-like wilderness just off the coast.

Plant life 
Inside the forests off the shore of Gibney Beach, there is also an abundance of plant life.  Gibney Beach lies on the eastern coast of the island and is characterized by dry forest vegetation.  Cacti such as the barbed-wire cactus (Acanthocereus tetragonus), prickly pear (Opuntia spp.), organ pipe cactus (Pilosocereus royenii) and Turk's cap cactus (Melocactus intortus) are prominent in the area.  These cacti grow alongside shrubs, such as maran (Croton flavens var. rigidula), and thorn bushes like casha (Acacia tortuosa) and catch-and-keep (Acacia retusa).  The thorny nature of these forests make them difficult to navigate.  Mangrove forests can also be found off Gibney Beach. Mangrove trees alter the shoreline, changing salinity, tidal inundation and oxygenation of the soil.  Red mangroves (Rhizophora mangle) are the most common and grow in the ocean.  They have specialized prop roots that protect shorelines and serve as nurseries for many marine animals.  Other mangrove species that can be found on the coast are the black mangrove (Avicennia germinans), white mangrove (Laguncularia racemosa), and buttonwood mangrove (Conocarpus erectus). Other more exotic trees can be found in residential areas off Gibney Beach.  Gardens often include orchids, heliconia, ylang-ylang trees, and fruit trees such as coconut, star fruit,  bananas and mango.

On the coast 
The coast of Gibney Beach is also full of wildlife.  The sand that makes up Gibney beach is made primarily from two sources, marine algae and living coral reefs. Sea turtles occasionally visit the beach to lay eggs.  Sandpipers and other shore birds are often on the beach, searching for small crabs and mollusks that live beneath the sand.

Ocean life 
Perhaps the most interesting wildlife of St. John is located beneath the surface of the ocean. Gibney Beach is not a big attraction for snorkelers because much of the marine life off Gibney Beach was significantly damaged during a heavy rain during the excavation for the Myrah Keating Smith Clinic.  Soil was washed down into the bay and resulted in turbidity that damaged much of the coral life in the bay.  The coral reefs are slowly coming back to life bringing more animal marine life with them.

There are many kinds of coral located off the shores of Gibney beach, including: brain coral, elkhorn, staghorn, boulder coral and fire coral.  These coral reefs are colorful and contain a variety of fish and other aquatic creatures.  Atop these large coral bodies sit sea fans, sea whips and sea plumes.  Coral animals like star coral, brain coral, coral polyps, and pillar coral can be seen extending their tentacles at night.

Common fish off Gibney Beach include: goatfish, grunts, tangs, parrotfish, angelfish, squirrelfish, trunkfish, trumpetfish, yellowtail snapper, blue runners, groupers, butterflyfish, damselfish, squirrelfish, porcupinefish, and wrasses, as well as octopuses and various types of eels.  The reefs also house a number of invertebrates including sponges, starfish, sea urchins, sea worms, crabs, lobsters, and sea anemones.

Tourism

Getting to Gibney
There are no signs that lead you to Gibney, no parking lot and no facilities. There is only a small gravel road leading down to the beach, blocked off by a tall white gate to keep cars out. There is a small opening in the gate allowing entrance by foot. In front of the gate, a small portion of the road is open where about four cars will tightly fit. Even though it is open to the public, the beach has a very private feel.

Gibney Beach neighbors Hawksnest Beach. The entrance is the third driveway on your left if passing Hawksnest. To the right of the driveway is the Oppenheimer part of the beach. The southwestern part is Gibney. While they are nearly the same beach, the Oppenheimer house is open to the public, but the Gibney house sections are private. In the Virgin Islands, public domain property is from the sea to the first line of vegetation. Behind the first line of vegetation, the Gibney Beach property belongs to the Gibney family. Gibney has appeared on commercials and in magazines. It has also been used by Hollywood as settings for the motion pictures “The Four Seasons” and “Columbus”.

Villas
There are only two villas on the beach available for rent by visitors and tourists: the Gibney Garden Cottage and the Gibney Beach Cottage, both located directly on the beach. The cottages can be rented separately or together. Botanical gardens surround the two villas are filled with orchids, heliconia, ylang ylang trees and fruit trees consisting of exotic plants and fruits including coconuts and star fruit.

Gibney beach has limited parking, and there are no hotels or condos to rent on the land.  There are, however, a few homes that are within easy walking distance to Gibney Beach, that are also popular with visitors and tourists.  Tourists also have a very scenic and easy drive on paved roads into different shops and restaurants of Cruz Bay nearby.

Activities 
For simply relaxing on the beach and enjoying the nature of St. John, many people, both tourists and locals alike, visit Gibney Beach for its quieter atmosphere.  This private, “off-the-beaten-path” quality of Gibney Beach is because there are no water sport rentals, eateries, and only limited parking available. Sea grape trees and palms line the shore creating shade.  There are tree-covered picnic tables for those who wish to bring their own meal and enjoy family and friends at the beach.  There is no admission charge at Gibney Beach.

Snorkeling
Although it is not the favored snorkeling area in St. John, the most popular activity at Gibney Beach is snorkeling.  This is due to the accessibility of waters and the waters’ appropriate conditions for the most novice to advanced snorkeling. The snorkeling here is also popular because of the vast array of coral and fish that are visible on the fringing reef in the area.  In addition to the plants and animals, there is a sunken sailboat that is accessible to explore while snorkeling.  The best snorkeling here is during the summer.

The Community Center at Gibney Beach was once the home of the Oppenheimer family.  Now this portion of the beach is public and offers the best access to the reef.  Here, the white sand is soft and the water is shallow and ideal for beginners.  For more advanced snorkeling, one can continue north on the eastern coastline to Perkins Cay and Denis Bay.  The deeper waters range from six to ten feet deep.

Much of the colorful reef life is very close to the shore.  It is possible to see sections of boulder, fire, brain, and elkhorn coral.  Spottings of both small and medium schools are fish are common.  The fish close to the shore, visible while snorkeling, include: parrotfish, squirrelfish, trunkfish, trumpetfish, goatfish, grunt, and tang.  There are also predator fish like the yellowtail snapper and the blue runner.

Local entertainment
Local reggae and calypso bands sometimes perform at Gibney Beach at the Community Center.

References 

Beaches of the United States Virgin Islands
Bays of the United States Virgin Islands
Landforms of Saint John, U.S. Virgin Islands